Two's Company is a British television situation comedy series that ran from 1975 to 1979. Produced by London Weekend Television for the ITV Network, the programme starred Elaine Stritch and Donald Sinden.

Premise
Dorothy McNab (Stritch) is an American author residing in London. As she spends most of her days writing, she hires an English butler, Robert Hiller (Sinden), to help run her Chelsea home. Being the epitome of the English gentleman, Robert does not approve of Dorothy's lurid thriller novels or her American ways. Much of the comedy stems from the banter between the two, as they continually disagree due to their cultural differences and often try to outwit each other.

History
Two's Company was created by Bill MacIlwraith, who also wrote all of the episodes. Although the first and second series were not simulcast nationally in the UK, the third and fourth series were shown in a primetime Sunday evening slot by all ITV stations. It was nominated for a BAFTA Award for "Best Comedy" programme in 1977, and was nominated for four BAFTA Awards in 1979, including "Best Comedy", "Best Graphics" (opening credits sequence) and Stritch and Sinden were each nominated for "Best Light Entertainment Performance".

Stritch and Sinden also performed the series theme song, with lyrics written by Sammy Cahn and music by Denis King, which played during the animated opening credits sequence where Stritch's character is portrayed as a brassy American eagle and Sinden's as a snooty British lion.

After its success in the UK, the series was remade for U.S. television in 1981 as The Two of Us starring Peter Cook and Mimi Kennedy, though this version was less successful and was cancelled the following year. Additionally, the original series was rerun on A&E during the mid-1980s.

All four series of Two's Company have been released on DVD in the UK, the US, and Australia.

Episodes

Series overview

Series 1 (1975)

Christmas Special (1976)

Series 2 (1977)

Series 3 (1978)

Series 4 (1979)

References

External links

1970s British sitcoms
1975 British television series debuts
1979 British television series endings
English-language television shows
ITV sitcoms
London Weekend Television shows
Television duos
Television series by ITV Studios
Television shows set in London